John Clarence Maurice "Cotton" Howell (September 22, 1927 – October 6, 1981) was an American football player who played at the end position. He played college football for Texas A&M and professional football for the San Francisco 49ers.

Early years
Howell was born in 1927 in Houston. He attended and played football at Nacogdoches High School.

Military and college football
He played college football for the Texas A&M Aggies in 1944, 1946, and 1947. He was selected as a second-team end on the 1944 All-Southwest Conference football team. He also served in the United States Merchant Marine.

Professional football
Howell played professional football in the All-America Football Conference for the San Francisco 49ers during their 1948 season. He appeared in 12 of 14 games for the 1948 49ers. He also played for the 1949 Richmond Rebels team that won the American Football League championship.

Family and later years
Howell died in 1981 at age 54 in Houston.

References

1927 births
1981 deaths
San Francisco 49ers (AAFC) players
Texas A&M Aggies football players
Players of American football from Houston
American football ends
San Francisco 49ers players